John Clare (1793–1864) was an English poet

John Clare may also refer to:

John Clare (journalist) (born 1955), English author and journalist
John Clare (soccer), American soccer coach

See also
John Clare Billing (1866–1955), English organist and composer
John Clare Whitehorn (1894–1974), American psychiatric educator